Randolph is a town in Rich County, Utah, United States. As of the 2010 census, the town population was 464. It is the county seat of Rich County. Randolph had the highest percentage of people of any city in the country vote for George W. Bush in the 2004 election, at 95.6% Randolph's municipal classification was officially changed from a city to a town on January 1, 2009. The controversial WWASPS boarding school Old West Academy (formerly Majestic Ranch Academy) is located just outside Randolph.

Geography and climate
According to the United States Census Bureau, the town has a total area of 1.0 square mile (2.7 km2), all land.

Randolph has a humid continental climate (Köppen Dfb), with long and cold winters, short summers with very warm days and cold nights, and fairly heavy winter snowfall totalling  during an average year. The most precipitation in one day has been  on July 31, 1912, and the most in one month  in June 1998.

The hottest temperature has been  on July 19, 1893, whilst the coldest has been  on February 1, 1985.

Demographics

As of the census of 2000, there were 483 people, 150 households, and 118 families residing in the town. The population density was 466.1 people per square mile (179.3/km2). There were 190 housing units at an average density of 183.4 per square mile (70.5/km2). The racial makeup of the city was 99.38% (480 people) White, 0.21% (one person) Asian, and 0.41% (two people) from two or more races. Hispanic or Latino of any race were 1.86% of the population (nine individuals).

There were 150 households, out of which 49.3% had children under the age of 18 living with them, 73.3% were married couples living together, 2.7% had a female householder with no husband present, and 20.7% were non-families. 18.7% of all households were made up of individuals, and 7.3% had someone living alone who was 65 years of age or older. The average household size was 3.21 and the average family size was 3.74.

In the town, the population was spread out, with 38.5% under the age of 18, 7.2% from 18 to 24, 26.3% from 25 to 44, 16.8% from 45 to 64, and 11.2% who were 65 years of age or older. The median age was 30 years. For every 100 females, there were 101.3 males. For every 100 females age 18 and over, there were 102.0 males.

The median income for a household in the town was $34,792, and the median income for a family was $42,917. Males had a median income of $35,625 versus $20,833 for females. The per capita income for the city was $13,477. About 9.5% of families and 14.0% of the population were below the poverty line, including 17.6% of those under age 18 and 3.5% of those age 65 or over.

Notable people
 David M. Kennedy, Secretary of the Treasury from 1969–1971
 Reuben D. Law, college president, chairman of the Utah State Board of Education (1976-7)

References

Towns in Rich County, Utah
Towns in Utah
County seats in Utah
Populated places established in 1870
1870 establishments in Utah Territory